An important historical document for the reign of Richard II, the chronicle written at Westminster Abbey covers the years from 1381 to 1394. The chronicle is in Latin.

Editions and translations

 The Westminster Chronicle, 1381-1394, ed. and trans. by L. C. Hector and Barbara F. Harvey, Oxford Medieval Texts (Oxford: Clarendon Press, 1982).

References

14th-century documents
Richard II of England
Westminster Abbey